Kari Häkämies (born 1956) is a Finnish lawyer and politician being a member of the National Coalition Party. He served as the justice minister and interior minister and was elected to the Finnish Parliament. He is also the author of several political thriller novels first of which was published in 2010.

Biography
Häkämies was born in Karhula in 1956. He received a degree in law from University of Helsinki in 1982.

Häkämies works as a lawyer. He is part of the National Coalition Party. He served as the justice minister between 2 February 1996 and 12 March 1998 in the first cabinet of Paavo Lipponen. Häkämies was elected as mayor of Kuopio in 1998 and held the post until 2001. He was appointed minister of interior to the second cabinet of Lipponen on 15 April 1999. Häkämies resigned from the office on 30 August 2000 and was replaced by Ville Itälä in the post on 1 September. 

Häkämies was first elected to the Finnish Parliament on 2 March 1987. His parliamentary tenure ended on 31 July 1998. He is the chairman of the Regional Council of Southwest Finland or region mayor of Southwest Finland.

References

External links

20th-century Finnish politicians
21st-century Finnish writers
20th-century Finnish lawyers
21st-century Finnish lawyers
1956 births
Living people
Ministers of the Interior of Finland
Ministers of Justice of Finland
National Coalition Party politicians
Finnish male novelists
People from Kotka
Members of the Parliament of Finland (1987–91)
Members of the Parliament of Finland (1991–95)
Members of the Parliament of Finland (1995–99)
Mayors of places in Finland
University of Helsinki alumni